Gabriel Nicolae Enache  (born 18 August 1990) is a Romanian professional footballer who plays as a right back or a winger for Liga I side FC U Craiova.

Club career

Mioveni
Enache scored his first Mioveni goal in a 1–1 second division draw with FCM Târgoviște on 23 August 2008.

On 22 July 2011, aged 20, he recorded his first Liga I appearance in a 0–1 loss to Universitatea Cluj.

Astra Giurgiu

In the summer of 2012, Enache agreed to a four-year contract with the option of another year with Astra Ploiești, soon relocated and renamed Astra Giurgiu.

On 23 October 2014, Enache scored the last goal of a UEFA Europa League group stage away game with Celtic, which ended in a 2–1 victory for "the Bhoys".

He amassed Liga I totals of 102 matches and ten goals during his time at the club.

FCSB
On 22 February 2016, FCSB signed Enache on a five-year deal for an undisclosed transfer fee. He was handed the number 44 shirt and played eleven games in the remainder of the 2015–16 Liga I. He scored his first goal for the Roș-albaștrii in a 1–1 draw with Pandurii Târgu Jiu, on 1 May that year.

In his following season at the club, Enache netted three goals in 29 league matches.

On 24 February 2018, FCSB announced that his contract had been terminated on mutual agreement.

Rubin Kazan
On 28 February 2018, Enache signed a contract with Russian team Rubin Kazan. He made his competitive debut two days later, playing the full 90 minutes in a 1–1 league draw to Anzhi Makhachkala. His contract was not extended by Rubin as it expired at the end of the 2017–18 season.

Partizan
On 20 July 2018, it was announced Enache will join Partizan for the 2018–19 season. He made a deal with the club on same day, afternoon, choosing to wear number 44 shirt, which was assigned to Armin Đerlek in the past season. Enache made his debut for new club in starting line-up in the first leg match of the first qualifying round for 2018–19 UEFA Europa League campaign, against Rudar Pljevlja. On 7 September 2019, Enache left the club.

Return to Astra Giurgiu
On 19 September 2019, Enache signed a two-year contract with Liga I club Astra Giurgiu.

International career
On 7 September 2014, Enache made his full debut for Romania in a 1–0 win against Greece counting for the UEFA Euro 2016 qualifiers, coming on as a substitute for Alexandru Maxim.

Personal life
Enache wed his partner Mădălina in May 2014. She gave birth to a daughter, however the couple filed for divorce in 2017. Enache has since been in a relationship with a woman he met during the marriage.

Some of Enache's tattoos are a representation of his religious beliefs.

Career statistics

Club

International

Honours

Club
Astra Giurgiu
Cupa României: 2013–14
Supercupa României: 2014

Steaua București
Cupa Ligii: 2015–16

References

External links
 
 
 
 

1990 births
People from Argeș County
Living people
Romanian footballers
Association football midfielders
Association football defenders
Liga I players
Liga II players
CS Mioveni players
FC Astra Giurgiu players
FC Steaua București players
FC Dunărea Călărași players
FC U Craiova 1948 players
Russian Premier League players
FC Rubin Kazan players
Serbian SuperLiga players
FK Partizan players
Kazakhstan Premier League players
FC Kyzylzhar players
FC Zhetysu players
Romania under-21 international footballers
Romania international footballers
Romanian expatriate footballers
Romanian expatriate sportspeople in Russia
Expatriate footballers in Russia
Romanian expatriate sportspeople in Serbia
Expatriate footballers in Serbia
Romanian expatriate sportspeople in Kazakhstan
Expatriate footballers in Kazakhstan